Irene Emma Mullen (February 16, 1914 – December 26, 1981), later known by her married name Irene Warwick, was a Canadian freestyle swimmer who competed in the 1932 Summer Olympics in Los Angeles. In 1932 she was a member of the Canadian relay team which finished fourth in the 4x100-metre freestyle relay.  In the 100-metre freestyle, she was eliminated in the first round.

References

External links 
 
 
 

1914 births
1981 deaths
Canadian female freestyle swimmers
Olympic swimmers of Canada
Sportspeople from Hamilton, Ontario
Swimmers at the 1932 Summer Olympics